Sesquiluna theophoboides is a moth in the Endromidae family. It is found in Vietnam.

References

Moths described in 2009
Sesquiluna